Michael Djupstrom (born 1980) is an American composer. Born in St. Paul, Minnesota, he grew up in White Bear Lake, Minnesota. After completing undergraduate and graduate studies in composition at the University of Michigan, Djupstrom moved to Philadelphia, Pennsylvania where he completed an Artist Diploma at the Curtis Institute of Music.  His music has garnered many awards, and is published by Bright Press and Boosey & Hawkes.

His composition teachers include Jennifer Higdon, Richard Danielpour, Bright Sheng and Betsy Jolas, among others.

Awards
2002 – ASCAP/CBDNA Frederick Fennell Prize
2002 – Walter Beeler Memorial Composition Prize, Ithaca College
2003, 2004 – ASCAP Foundation Morton Gould Young Composer Award
2004 – William Schuman Prize, BMI Foundation
2005 – ASCAP/Lotte Lehmann Foundation Song Cycle Competition, 3rd prize
2005 – Music Teachers National Association - Shepherd Distinguished Composer of the Year
2006 – Great Wall International Composition Competition, 1st Prize & Audience Prize, Chinese Fine Arts Society
2010 – Charles Ives Fellowship, The American Academy of Arts and Letters
2012 – American Viola Society's Maurice Gardner Composition Competition grand prize winner for Walimai
2012 – Delius International Composition Prize
2013 – Columbia Orchestra American Composer Competition winner for Scène et Pas de deux
2013 – Grand Prize, Washington Awards, S&R Foundation
2014 – Pew Fellowship in the Arts, Pew Center for Arts & Heritage

References

External links

American male composers
21st-century American composers
Living people
1980 births
University of Michigan School of Music, Theatre & Dance alumni
Pew Fellows in the Arts
Curtis Institute of Music alumni
Musicians from Saint Paul, Minnesota
People from White Bear Lake, Minnesota
21st-century American male musicians